The 3rd Gujarat Legislative Assembly election was held in 1967. It was the second election held after formation of Gujarat.  Indian National Congress (INC) won 93 seats out of 168 seats. While, Swatantra Party (SWA) won 66 seats. INC performed badly in this election and lost 20 seats, and SWA improve performance and won 40 more seats. Total 599 men and 14 women contested in the election. Total 160 men and 8 women won in the elections. Number of polling stations were 11,554 and number of electors per polling stations were 926.

Results

Elected members

References

State Assembly elections in Gujarat
1960s in Gujarat
Gujarat